John Francis Campion (December 1849 – July 17, 1916) was a wealthy Canadian-American who made his fortune in mining and sugar production. He was also an executive and investor in banking, railroad, insurance, and other businesses. 

Campion ran away from school as a teen to join the Union Navy during the American Civil War. After the end of the war, Campion became a miner and became an expert on the geology of mining. He fought to maintain possession of his mining interests early in his career, and he became increasingly successful, founding the Ibex Mining Company in Leadville, Colorado in 1891. Two years later, an ore stream was found at the mine that made him a fortune. 

He was a co-founder of what is now called the Denver Museum of Nature and Science and was president of the board of trustees until his death in 1916. He donated his rare collection of native gold, which is among the best in the world.

Early life 
John Francis Campion was born in December 1849 on Prince Edward Island, Canada to Helen (nee Fehan) Campion and Michael Brevort, a shipbuilder and legislator. His grandparents, John F. Campion, Sr. and Elizabeth Campion, were Irish immigrants who settled in Price Edward Island in 1823. The family had been wealthy landowners in Ireland and England.

Campion was the eldest of four children born to Helen and M. Brevort Campion. He was followed by George F., born in 1849, Mary Ellen, born in 1854, and Elizabeth Margaret, born in 1857. By 1862, the Campions moved to Sacramento, California, when John and George returned to Canada and attended Prince of Wales College in Charlottetown, Prince Edward Island.

American Civil War
Campion ran away from school at the age of 16 and joined the United States Navy during the Civil War. He was recorded as having enlisted at the age of 17. His brother George tried to enlist, too, but he was refused because at age 15 he was too young. Campion returned to his parents in Sacramento after the end of the war.

Mining

Campion began his mining career in California and lost his investment of $5,000 in the White Pine silver mine in Nevada when a large consolidating mining company drove him out. He made a fortune by developing and selling properties in Eureka, California. John bought the Pioche-Phoenix silver mine in Pioche, Nevada, after he moved to the area with his brother and father. He hired gunfighters to protect his interest in the mine from Raymond and Ely mining company and their gunfighters, who tried to overtake the concern in January 1873. The case went to court and Campion retained possession of the property. He sold the mine before he returned to Canada.

In 1878, Campion was elected a member of the parliament of Prince Edward Island for a one-year term. At the end of the term, Campion, his father, and brother moved to Leadville, Colorado. Campion attracted investors because of his thorough knowledge of geology of the Leadville area, that enabled him to find large veins and predict the direction of ore deposits. This was key to his success in Leadville where the "geological strata was broken and displaced by many faults".

He founded the Iron Hill Consolidated Mining Company in 1879. By 1889, he had purchased "many mines". Campion bought the Little Jonny Mine in 1890. He formed Ibex Mining Company in 1891. The following year Eben Smith and James Joseph Brown (husband of Margaret "Molly" Brown) bought interests in the organization. Ibex owned the Little Jonny Mine, where dolomite sand had filled any shafts that were dug and was on the verge of closing. Leadville fell into a depression with the collapse of the silver marker. In 1893, Campion invested $30,000 in the mine. That year, Charles Boettcher also invested in the company. Campion hired Brown to solve the problem, which he did by adding more timbering and inserting bales of hay to avoid collapse. Brown was paid in shares of the company. The firm paid out $1 million in annual dividends to its stockholders beginning in 1894. The area became known as the Leadville Gold Belt, where modern mining practices and machinery was used to extend the life of mines. He also mined in Breckenridge, Colorado.

Campion named his mines after animals with horns or antlers, such as Bison, Elk, Caribou, Wapiti, Yak, and Caribou. He called the Little Jonny Mine Ibex Number 1. His big gold strike at the Little Jonny Mine made him and his partners rich. James Joseph Brown's wife Margaret "Molly" Brown won fame in the sinking of the great liner Titanic. 

During the Leadville miners' strike of 1896-97, Campion hired labor spies to infiltrate the Cloud City Miners' Union, Local 33 of the Western Federation of Miners. Spy reports compiled by the Thiel Detective Agency and forwarded to John Campion are currently housed at the Colorado Historical Society (now known as History Colorado).

Other business ventures
Campion was vice president of the Denver National Bank and an officer of the Carbonate National Bank of Leadville. He was president of the Northwestern Terminal Company and vice president of the Denver, Northwestern and Pacific Railway (also called Moffat Road). He was president of the Big Horn Mining and Cattle Company.

After 1900, Campion made a second fortune growing sugar beets. Campion and Boettcher partnered on the formation of the Great Western Sugar Company, and brought sugar beet agriculture to Colorado. They also co-founded the Ideal Cement Company. He was vice president of Denver's Seventeenth Street Building Company. Campion was an owner of the Leadville Light and Power Company.

Civic and cultural endeavors

Campion was a co-founder of the Denver Museum of Natural History (now the Denver Museum of Nature and Science ). He donated his gold collection of 600 specimens. It is one of the best collections of native gold in the world, and it includes some of the "finest examples of crystallized gold". The museum was incorporated in 1900. He was the museum's first president of the board of trustees until his death in 1916.

Campion was president of the Denver Chamber of Commerce from 1898 to 1899 and of the Municipal Art League of Denver. He was a member of the American Association for the Advancement of Science. He also gave money toward the construction of the Cathedral Basilica of the Immaculate Conception. The bell in the east tower is dedicated to his memory.

Personal life

Campion married Nella "Nellie" May Daly, the daughter of Thomas Daly, Capitol Life Insurance Company founder, in Denver on April 15, 1895. By 1900, they lived in Denver at a house built at 800 Logan Street in 1899. At the time, it was one of the few houses in the city to have electricity, which ran off its own onsite power plant. They also had a residence at Twin Lakes near Leadville, where Campion had business offices.

Nellie was mentioned in the Colorado representative women of 1914:

Campion and Nellie had four children: John F. Jr., born in 1896, Helen Margaret, born in 1899, Mary, Phyllis born in 1901, and George Roland, born in 1902.

Campion died on July 17, 1916, in Denver, Colorado. He is buried in the Campion mausoleum at the Mt. Olivet Cemetery in Wheat Ridge, Colorado.

Legacy
Campion was inducted into the National Mining Hall of Fame in 2003. His biography on their website states:

 

The community of Campion, Colorado is named after him.

A collection of his papers is held at the John F. Campion Papers, Alfred M. Bailey Library & Archives, Denver Museum of Nature & Science.

Notes

References

People from Leadville, Colorado
1849 births
1916 deaths
19th-century American businesspeople
People from Prince Edward Island
American miners
American investors
Union Navy personnel
Prince of Wales College alumni